The battle of Sayan Mountains was a major battle between the Göktürks and Yenisei Kyrgyz Khaganate followed by a successful battle led by Tonyukuk.

Battle
When Kul Tigin was 26 years old, in winter time, 710 or 711, The Göktürk army set out for the Kyrgyz campaign. Kul Tigin and Bilge Qaghan also joined this expedition, the army was led by Tonyukuk. The Göktürk army which overcame the snow-covered Kögmen yiş (a place) with a spear length ( by foot, through Ak Termil where only one person could pass at a time, by rolling down, overcoming the obstacle on the mountain in ten days and going down the Ani Suyu), a night attack on Kyrgyz organized. According to Gumiliev, the reason why Tonyukuk, Kul Tigin and Bilge Qaghan made a night attack that the Kyrgyz had a well-armed, 80.000 strong army and had enough hay for there horses, this 3 showed also there military genius. In the battle, Kul Tigin mounted the white stallion of Bayirku, whom they had beaten before, and attacked, killed many soldiers. During these attack, the Kyrgyz attacked Kul Tigin’s horse by “breaking his thigh they shot”. At the end of the battle, the Kyrgyz were defeated, the Kyrgyz Khagan was killed, “the province was taken”, the Turks returned to otuken.

References

Citations 

K.T.II.D.26-27
B.T.II.D.6-7, K.1-4.
Nicolle, David, (1990). Attila and the Nomad Hordes, Oxford: Osprey Publishing Limited.
Giraud, René, (1999). Gök Türk Empire, İlteriş, Kapgan and Bilge's Reigns (680-734), (trans. İsmail Mangaltepe), İstanbul: Ötüken Publications.

Military history of the Göktürks